Lowell Park is a municipal park located along the Rock River in northern Dixon, Illinois. The city acquired the land for the park in 1906, when Carlotta Lowell donated the land to commemorate her parents' lives. Lowell recruited the Olmsted Brothers, a nationally prominent architecture firm formed by the sons of Frederick Law Olmsted, to provide a design for the park; their design emphasized the park's natural scenery by ensuring that its manmade features complemented rather than distracted from it. The park opened to the public in 1907, though its original plan was not fully completed until 1942. It served as a forerunner to state parks, and according to the Dixon Evening Telegraph, it remained the only park of its kind in the region as late as the 1930s. In addition, the park preserves one of the few remaining segments of the Boles Trail, which ran from Peoria to Galena.

The park was added to the National Register of Historic Places on August 8, 2006.

References

Parks on the National Register of Historic Places in Illinois
National Register of Historic Places in Lee County, Illinois
Dixon, Illinois
Historic districts in Illinois
1907 establishments in Illinois